Selamia is a genus of spiders in the family Zodariidae. It was first described in 1873 by Simon. , it contains three species native to the Mediterranean.

References

Zodariidae
Araneomorphae genera
Spiders of Africa